2016 was the 5th year in the history of RXF, the largest mixed martial arts promotion based in Romania.

List of events

RXF 22
 

RXF 22: Romania vs. Poland was a mixed martial arts event that took place on March 21, 2016 at the Bucharest Metropolitan Circus in Bucharest, Romania.

Results

RXF 23
 

RXF 23: Romania vs. United Kingdom (also known as Judgment Day) was a mixed martial arts event that took place on June 6, 2016 at the Sala Polivalentă in Bucharest, Romania.

Results

RXF 24
 

RXF 24: Brașov was a mixed martial arts event that took place on October 10, 2016 at the Dumitru Popescu Arena in Brașov, Romania.

Results

RXF 25
 

RXF 25: All Stars was a mixed martial arts event that took place on December 19, 2016 at the Olimpia Arena in Ploiești, Romania.

Results

See also
 2016 in UFC
 2016 in Bellator MMA
 2016 in ONE Championship
 2016 in Absolute Championship Berkut
 2016 in Konfrontacja Sztuk Walki
 2016 in Romanian kickboxing

References

External links
RXF 

2016 in mixed martial arts 
Real Xtreme Fighting events